This is a list of ministers from Kalikho Pul cabinets starting from 19 February 2016 to 13 July 2016. Kalikho Pul was the leader of People's Party of Arunachal was sworn in the Chief Minister of Arunachal Pradesh in 19 February 2016.

Ministers 

 Pema Khandu - Chief Minister
 Kameng Dolo - Deputy Chief Minister
 Chowna Mein - Deputy Chief Minister
 Kumar Waii 
 Lombo Tayeng 
 Wanglin Lowangdong 
 Kamlung Mossang 
 Tenzing Norbu Thongdok

See also 

 Kalikho Pul
 2015–16 Arunachal Pradesh political crisis
 Government of Arunachal Pradesh
 Arunachal Pradesh Legislative Assembly
 North-East Democratic Alliance
 People's Party of Arunachal

References

People's Party of Arunachal
2016 in Indian politics
Arunachal Pradesh ministries

2016 establishments in Arunachal Pradesh
Cabinets established in 2016
Cabinets disestablished in 2016
2016 disestablishments in India